Kante Koothurne Kanu is a 1998 Indian Telugu-language drama film written, directed and produced by Dasari Narayana Rao starring Ramya Krishna in the lead role. The film won the National Film Award Special Mention Feature Film, "for taking a stand on gender discrimination" at the 46th National Film Awards, and won five state Nandi Awards including Best Feature Film. The film was later remade in Kannada as Hetthare Heranne Herrabekku (2007).

Plot
The film explores the intricacies of gender discrimination, and misogyny in India.

Cast 

 Dasari Narayana Rao
 Jayasudha  as   Satya
 Ramya Krishna as Jyothi
 Babloo Prithiveeraj
 A.V.S.
 Ali
 Brahmanandam 	... Sofa set seller
 Narra Venkateswara Rao
 Jayanthi
 T. L. Kanta Rao
 P. J. Sharma
 Allu Ramalingaiah
 Chitti Babu

Soundtrack

Awards 
National Film Awards
Special Jury Award (Feature Film - Director) - Dasari Narayana Rao

Nandi Awards - 1998
 Second Best Feature Film - Silver - Dasari Narayana Rao
 Best Director - Dasari Narayana Rao
 Best Story Writer - Dasari Narayana Rao
 Best Lyricist - Suddala Ashok Teja
 Special Jury Award - Ramya Krishna

References

External links 
 

1990s Telugu-language films
Films directed by Dasari Narayana Rao
1998 films
Telugu films remade in other languages
Films about women in India
Indian feminist films
Films about discrimination
Films about sexism
Films about misogyny
Social realism in film
Films set in Hyderabad, India
Films about social issues in India
Films about families
Films about violence against women
Films about domestic violence